Daniel Henchman (January 21, 1689 – February 25, 1761) was a renowned American publisher and bookseller in 18th-century colonial Boston. Aside from his mainstay of publishing, printing, and bookselling, he was involved in a variety of mercantile pursuits. He was also very involved in Boston's civic matters and gave generously to the poor fund through his church. He was also an officer in the Boston militia regiment. Primarily through Henchman's efforts, the first paper mill to appear in New England was built in Massachusetts. Some historians consider Henchman to be the most prominent publisher and bookseller in pre-Revolutionary New England.

Early life and family 

Daniel Henchman was born in Boston on January 21, 1689. He was the son of Hezekiah and Abigail Henchman, and grandson of Captain Daniel Henchman (1623–1685), who emigrated to New England from London, and who was a captain in the New England Confederation who served with distinction in King Philip's War. Henchman had a daughter, Lydia, who married Thomas Hancock, who left his estate to his nephew, John Hancock, the renowned patriot. As a young man, Thomas worked as a clerk in Henchman's bookstore.

Civic life 
Henchman lived on Queen Street in what was the Brattle Street Society's parsonage, which was later willed to that society by his daughter, Mrs. Hancock. He was very involved in Boston's civic and other affairs. He was a clerk of the market in 1716 selling produce, seafood and wine, and spirits. He was an incorporator of Boston's Fire Society in 1717 and a member of a militia company in Boston in 1722, 1726, and 1727. In 1735 he returned to militia duty and ultimately advanced to the rank of Lieutenant Colonel. He functioned in Boston's Overseers of the Poor from 1735 to 1756. Henchman was appointed a justice of the peace on January 26, 1738-9, and was again appointed on September 14, 1756. He was also a Deacon of the Old South Church for a number of years.

Publisher and bookseller 
In 1711, soon after Henchman reached the age of twenty-one, he began selling books and stationery in Boston with great success and prestige. His well-known bookshop was located on the corner of State and Washington streets, which later was the same house where Henry Knox was brought up after his father died. Several historians have noted Henchman's enterprising and successful capacity as a publisher and bookseller, including Isaiah Thomas who maintained that "Henchman was the most eminent and enterprising bookseller that appeared in Boston, or, indeed, in all British America, before the year 1775."

Henchman often employed the printing services of Samuel Kneeland and Timothy Green, and once commissioned them to print the first Bible in the English language to appear in the British-American colonies. As such, the printing had to be performed as privately as possible and bore the same London imprint of the edition from which it was copied, to avoid prosecution.  He also employed various other printers in Boston. Henchman's business expenses, involvements, and relations with various printers are covered in great detail in Rollo G. Silver's work, Publishing in Boston, 1726–1757: the accounts of Daniel Henchman, published in 1956.

The first paper mill to be established north of New Jersey grew out of the action of the Massachusetts Assembly of 1728. Henchman was the senior promoter whose initiative was probably the cause of the Assembly's action, joined with Gillam Phillips, Benjamin Faneuil, Thomas Hancock, and Henry Deering and built a paper manufactory at Milton on the Neponset River sometime in the year 1729. More than twenty years before, a mill with a raceway had been built on the Milton side of the Neponset river, some eight miles upstream from Boston. Henchman and his associates leased and converted it into a paper mill and added an adjoining house for their workmen. The upper story housed a loft used for the drying of paper. By 1731 Henchman provided to the general court in Boston a sample sheet of paper made at his mill, though the mill was already in production before this time. Though it was initially slow in getting started the mill soon proved to be so successful an operation that it was often referred to in official correspondence, newspapers, and other publications of the time as a much-needed establishment.

Final years 
Before his death Henchman made out a will leaving a significant sum to the poor fund of the Old South Church, where for many years he served as a deacon. His wife was deceased, he left his estate to his daughter Lydia and her husband, Thomas Hancock. Henchman died in Boston on February 25, 1761, at the age of 72. His obituary appeared in The Boston Gazette and Country Journal on March 2, 1761. Though he was no longer an officer in the Boston militia regiment Henchman's funeral procession was escorted by Captain Dawes and other officers of the Boston regiment.

See also 
 List of early American publishers and printers
 History of printing

Notes

Citations

Bibliography 

 

 

 

 

  Open Library

External links 
 Hensman Coat of Arms / Hensman Family Crest

1689 births
1761 deaths
18th-century publishers (people)
Businesspeople from Boston